Aragh sagi (doggy [metaphor for extreme] distilled [beverage]) is a type of Iranian moonshine. This distilled alcoholic beverage usually contains around 50% alcohol. However, since it is produced illicitly, it may contain more or less alcohol, at times even reaching 80%. A high-quality aragh sagi tastes similar to grappa. Some Western sources call it "Persian vodka".

Etymology 

Aragh ("Arak") are aromatic liquids that are produced by distillation from herbs and seeds, for example mint or anise. Alcoholic aragh is produced from raisins, dates, etc. Aragh sagi is a purer and stronger sort of Iranian arak distilled from raisins but without anise.

Aragh Sagi literally means "doggy distilled [beverage]", from sag ( "dog" in Persian being a metaphor for extreme).
Back in 1960s, the Meikadeh company produced aragh with a picture of a dog (a beagle) on the bottle as a logo, and soon public started referring to it as aragh sagi or "doggy aragh", and the name stuck.

Legality
Since the Iranian revolution in 1979, Alcohol is illegal in Iran. As such, Aragh sagi in Iran is produced illicitly.

History 
It is usually produced in homes from fermented raisins. Its production and possession by ordinary citizens is considered illegal in Iran (which is the case for all alcoholic beverages in Iran). Prior to 1979 revolution in Iran, this product had been produced traditionally in several cities, such as Yazd. Since it was outlawed after 1979, it became a black market and underground business. Today, aragh sagi is widely considered a cheap alcoholic beverage that consumers choose due to lack of other available alternative options.

References

External links
Aragh-e Sagi on Distillers Wiki

Distilled drinks
Iranian drinks
Iranian distilled drinks